Brimley's chorus frog (Pseudacris brimleyi) is a species of frog in the family Hylidae, endemic to the United States, and is named for North Carolina zoologist C.S. Brimley.
Its natural habitats are subtropical forests, rivers, intermittent rivers, swamps, freshwater marshes, intermittent freshwater marshes, ponds, open excavations, and canals and ditches.
It is threatened by habitat loss.

References

Herps of North Carolina--Brimley's Chorus Frog—accessed 19 June 2008

Chorus frogs
Taxonomy articles created by Polbot
Amphibians described in 1933
Amphibians of the United States